Gimhae FC is a South Korean football club based in the city of Gimhae. It was founded in 2007, and started competing in the National League until 2019. In 2020, the team started competing in the K3 League after 2019 season the final competing in the National League after absorbed to semi-professional league.

Current team squad

2022 season squad

Honours

Domestic competitions

League
 National League
  Runners-up (1): 2009

K3 League
  Champions (1): 2020Cups
 National Sports Festival'''
  Silver Medal (1): 2014

Season-by-seasons

See also
List of football clubs in South Korea

External links
 Gimhae FC Official Site
 Gimhae FC Facebook
 Gimhae FC Twitter

 
Korea National League clubs
Football clubs in South Gyeongsang Province
Organizations based in South Gyeongsang Province
Association football clubs established in 2008
2008 establishments in South Korea